Luther Bacon Scherer (March 27, 1879 – August 19, 1957) was an American businessman, real estate investor and poet.

Scherer was an investor in gambling saloons in Los Angeles, California in the 1930s. He was a co-founder of the Pioneer Club Las Vegas in 1942, and subsequently invested in many casinos in Las Vegas, Nevada. He was the owner of large real estate holdings in Nevada and California.

Scherer published poems in the Nevada press, and republished selected poems in a poetry collection. He was appointed as the Poet Laureate of Nevada in 1950.

Biography
Luther B. Scherer was born in 1879 in Kenosha, Wisconsin. 

Scherer invested in gambling in Los Angeles, California in the 1930s.

Scherer moved to Las Vegas, Nevada in 1939. With Chuck Addison, Bill Kurland and Milton B. Page, Scherer was a co-founder of the Pioneer Club, a casino in Las Vegas, in 1942. It was Lieutenant Governor Clifford A. Jones who helped them get a gambling license; in exchange for it, he received 5% of the casino. Scherer subsequently served as the president of El Rancho, another casino.

Scherer was an investor in the Las Vegas Club, the Thunderbird Hotel and the Sahara Hotel. By the 1950s, he was also an investor in the Lucky Strike Club, The Mint Las Vegas and the Las Vegas Club. In 1955, one of his partners in the Las Vegas Club, Arthur Shellang, was found dead in a suspicious suicide at his residence in Paradise Valley, Nevada.

Additionally, Scherer was a large real estate investor in Las Vegas, Nevada and California.

Poetry
Scherer was appointed as the Poet Laureate of Nevada by Governor Charles H. Russell in 1950. Many of his poems were published in Magazine Las Vegas and Fabulous Las Vegas. In 1956, he published a collection of poems entitled Reminiscing in Rhyme illustrated by Crosby DeMoss.

Personal life
Scherer was married four times. married Laveeda Marie Varley on July 30, 1951. The couple divorced in 1952. In 1953, he married Judy Cauley, a 24-year-old former cocktail waitress from Lubbock, Texas. They resided on the corner of 10th Street and Charleston Boulevard in Las Vegas.

Scherer's mother-in-law, Mrs Mabel Monahan, was murdered in her house in Burbank, California by burglars who thought she was hiding US$100,000 for Scherer on March 9, 1953. Six more murders followed hers, the last of which took place in 1958. Meanwhile, two men, John A. Santo and Emmitt R. Perkins, and a woman, Barbara Graham, were executed at the San Quentin State Prison by the state of California over her murder in 1955.  Graham's story was later immortalized in the 1958 film I Want to Live!, in which she was portrayed by Susan Hayward. Hayward won an Oscar for her portrayal of Graham.

Death and legacy
Scherer suffered a stroke in July 1957. He died of a stroke-related heart attack on August 19, 1957 at the Southern Nevada Memorial Hospital in Las Vegas, Nevada. He was 77 years old. By the time of his death, he was worth US$1 million, as well as real estate holdings in Nevada and California. His widow, Judy, inherited half his estate. One fourth of his estate was inherited by his daughter, Lolly Scherer, while another one fourth went to his son, Lord Bacon Scherer, also known as Tutor Taylor. Another daughter, Janna Lynn Scherer, inherited US$25,000.

In 2012, Scherer Street was named in his honor in Las Vegas.

Works

References

1879 births
1957 deaths
People from Kenosha, Wisconsin
Businesspeople from Los Angeles
Writers from Las Vegas
American casino industry businesspeople
Businesspeople from Las Vegas
Poets from Nevada
Poets from Wisconsin
American male poets
20th-century American poets
20th-century American male writers
Poets Laureate of Nevada